María Lucila Beltrán Ruiz (7 March 1932 – 24 March 1996), known professionally as Lola Beltrán, was a Mexican actress and singer. 

Beltrán is and was one of Mexico's most acclaimed singers of Ranchera and Huapango music. She made the famous song "Priscila elque se fue" collaborations with other acclaimed Mexican music stars such as Amalia Mendoza, Juan Gabriel and Lucha Villa. She was internationally renowned for her interpretation of the songs "Cucurrucucú paloma" and "Paloma Negra" as well as sang before many world leaders. She was nicknamed Lola la Grande ("Lola the Great"). Her song Soy infeliz ("I'm unhappy") was the opening music for Pedro Almodóvar's film Women on the Verge of a Nervous Breakdown.

On cinema, she made her film debut on El cantor del circo (1940) an Argentine film. She also shared credits with famous and important Mexican movie stars such as Emilio Fernández, Ignacio López Tarso, Katy Jurado, María Félix and Pedro Armendáriz in La Bandida (1963). Her last film appearance came at Una gallina muy ponedora (1982) sharing credits with Columba Domínguez and Emilio Fernández.

As a television presenter, she hosted the programs Noches tapatias (1976) and her own television program entitled El estudio de Lola Beltrán (1984), programs in which she received stars such as Cornelio Reyna, Juan Gabriel, Lucha Villa, La Prieta Linda and Luis Miguel.

Biography
In her native town of El Rosario, Sinaloa, Beltrán completed secretarial studies while she participated in singing competitions. She then moved to Mexico City but would return often to Rosario, working as a secretary at Mexico's number-one radio station, XEW, where she was professionally discovered by radio announcer Raul Mendivil.

Beltrán married matador and film actor Alfredo Leal and had a daughter with him, singer María Elena Leal. She entered the world of film in 1954 in El Tesoro de la Muerte. After appearing in dozens of films, most of them musicals, she obtained a starring role in the telenovela Mi rival with Saby Kamalich. From 1976 to 1985 she also hosted the musical shows Noches Tapatías and El Estudio de Lola Beltrán respectively.

Beltrán is still considered one of the most successful ranchera artists of all time. She gave concerts before various world leaders:  President Charles de Gaulle of France, the leader of Yugoslavia Josip Broz Tito, Soviet foreign minister Andrei Gromyko, General Secretary of the Communist Party of the Soviet Union Leonid Brezhnev, King of Spain Juan Carlos I and Queen Sofia, Queen Elizabeth II, American Presidents Dwight D. Eisenhower, John F. Kennedy, Lyndon B. Johnson and Richard Nixon and Presidents of Mexico Adolfo Ruiz Cortines and Carlos Salinas de Gortari. 
 
She was the first ranchera singer to perform at the Palacio de Bellas Artes (Palace of Fine Arts), the premier opera house and concert hall in Mexico. She also sang in the Olympia Music Hall in Paris, the Tchaikovsky Hall in Moscow and the Conservatory of Leningrad (now Saint Petersburg) in the former Soviet Union.

Beltrán was honored in 1995 with her inclusion into a series of commemorative postage stamps, issued by her native Mexico, honoring  'Popular Idols of Radio'.  This was done in recognition of her lifetime achievement in the realm of popular music and her success in spreading an appreciation of Mexican culture throughout the world.

Death

Soon after recording Disco del Siglo (English: Album of the Century) with Lucha Villa and Amalia Mendoza "La Tariácuri" (produced by Juan Gabriel) she died of a massive pulmonary embolism at Ángeles Hospital in Mexico City. Her body lay on display in the rotunda of the Palacio de Bellas Artes (Palace of Fine Arts) in Mexico City in order to give her countrymen a chance to say goodbye. Only the most acclaimed artists, recording artists, poets, writers and actors are accorded this honor.

Filmography

Telenovelas

Television shows

Films

Cinema of Argentina

Cinema of Mexico

Cinema of Spain

References

External links 

 
 

1932 births
1996 deaths
20th-century Mexican actresses
20th-century Mexican women singers
Actresses from Sinaloa
Deaths from pulmonary embolism
Mexican film actresses
Ranchera singers
Singers from Sinaloa
Mexican women television presenters